The Migrants' Rights Network (MRN) is a London based non-governmental organisation working for a rights-based approach to migration.

MRN works with organisations across the UK, aiming to strengthen the voice of migrants in discussion and debates.

The overall mission of MRN is to ensure recognition of migration as a key component of economic progress and development, in the creation of culturally rich and diverse societies, and in the promotion of human, political, social and economic rights and gender equality.

Background
The need for a permanent network of migrant organisations in the UK was first identified through the discussions and research undertaken by the Barrow Cadbury Trust funded project entitled 'Migrant Community Organisations in the UK (MCOP)'.

The project explored the possibility for closer and better collaboration between different groups working in the field of migration to strengthen the voice of migrants in the UK. Especially since such organisations often have limited funding, and have been set up to support what are often beleaguered communities with high numbers of refugees and asylum-seekers and/or significant numbers of irregular migrants.

The outcome of the MCOP's work was set out in the report "Migrant Voices, Migrant Rights" published by the Barrow Cadbury Trust.

In response to the recommendations of the report, the Migrant Rights Network (MRN) has been established as a permanent network of organisations working to support the development of migrants' rights across the UK. The network's main goal is to develop strategies which will increase the involvement of 'migrant voices' in national policy debates, and enhance cooperation across a wide range of civil society organisations to achieve this end.

References

External links
 Migrants' Rights Network Official Site

Immigration to the United Kingdom